Sharmin Sultana Shirin (born 26 January 1989) is a Bangladeshi chess player and two-time winner of the Women's Bangladeshi Chess Championship (2009 and 2013). In 2013, she became the sixth female Bangladeshi player to receive the FIDE title of Woman FIDE Master (WFM). She earned the Woman International Master title (WIM) in 2019.

She played chess at the 2010 Asian Games in the women's team standard and women's individual rapid events. She competed at the Chess Olympiads three times with the Bangladeshi women's chess team (2010, 2012, and 2014). She also played in the women's individual standard events at the 2013 and 2017 Asian Indoor and Martial Arts Games.

She was a participant at the Women's Chess World Cup 2021 in Sochi, where she faced American player Carissa Yip.

FIDE ratings

See also 
 Bengali name

References

External links 
 
 
 

1989 births
Living people
Bangladeshi female chess players
Chess Woman International Masters
Chess Olympiad competitors
Asian Games competitors for Bangladesh
Chess players at the 2010 Asian Games
Place of birth missing (living people)